Nasruddin Khan, or Nasruddin Beg, was the last ruler of Khanate of Kokand, then a protectorate of the Russian empire. He rose to power in 1875 when his father Khudayar fled uprisings in the Ferghana Valley. The Khanate of Kokand was abolished on 19 February 1876, and the region annexed to Ferghana Oblast.

References

Khans of Kokand
People from Kokand